What a Ghostly Silence There Is Tonight (Italian: Madonna che silenzio c'è stasera) is a 1982 Italian comedy film directed by Maurizio Ponzi.

Cast
Francesco Nuti as Francesco
Edy Angelillo as Maria
Massimo Sarchielli as Magnifico
Gianna Sammarco as the mother
Mario Cesarino as Filippo
Novello Novelli as Chiaramonti
Sergio Forconi as the man on the bus
Riccardo Tognazzi as Don Valerio

References

External links

1982 films
Films directed by Maurizio Ponzi
Films scored by Carlo Maria Cordio
1980s Italian-language films
1982 comedy films
Italian comedy films
Films set in Prato
Films set in Tuscany
Films shot in Tuscany
1980s Italian films